Operation Build is an American reality television home improvement series hosted by Alexi Panos with costars Andrew Dan-Jumbo, and Alena Capra. It first premiered on History Channel in November 2014. As of 2018 the show's site is on A&E television.

Operation Build travels all over the country discovering home improvement concepts in renovations, remodels, and do-it-yourself projects. Part History, part reality, part building technology; each episode has a project objective. Panos and her building team are tasked to complete each project in time, while being under a renovation deadline and a homeowner’s needs. Whether the team is picking up the pieces and rebuilding after a disaster, or coming to the rescue on a remodel gone wrong, the Operation Build team gets the job done.

Episode guide

Season 1 (2014)

Season 2 (2015)

References

2014 American television series debuts
2010s American reality television series
History (American TV channel) original programming
Home renovation television series